Quo was an Australian-American short-lived hip hop duo composed of Wade Robson (born 1982) and DeWayne Turrentine Jr. (born 1979). Preceded by Brownstone, they were the second act signed to Michael Jackson's Epic Records subsidiary, MJJ Music.

Formed in 1993, Quo released their debut single "Huh What", produced by Redman, in 1994, followed by their second single "Blowin' Up (Don't Stop the Music)", produced by Teddy Riley, which became a hip hop hit, charting on both the Hot Rap Songs and the Hot R&B/Hip-Hop Songs charts.

On October 25, 1994, the duo's self-titled album was released. The following year, the duo's third and final single "Quo Funk" was released, produced by Battlecat, which heavily sampled The Jacksons' "This Place Hotel" and charted at #2 on the Bubbling Under R&B/Hip-Hop Singles chart.

After the duo's disbandment following the release of "Quo Funk", Robson became a successful choreographer, producer, and actor, while Turrentine became a successful international supermodel, producer, and actor. Turrentine married actress Reagan Gomez-Preston in 1999, with whom he has two children, a daughter named Scarlett Annette Turrentine (born May 14, 2007) and a son named Tyger Attila Turrentine (born April 2, 2011).

Discography

Albums
Quo (1994)

Singles
"Huh What" (1994)
"Blowin' Up (Don't Stop the Music)" (1994)
"Quo Funk" (1995)

American hip hop groups
Australian hip hop groups
Epic Records artists
Musical groups established in 1993
Musical groups disestablished in 1995
American musical duos
Australian musical duos
Hip hop duos